State Route 599 (SR 599) is a  state highway in Clark County, Nevada. The route follows Rancho Drive, a major arterial connecting downtown Las Vegas to the northwest part of the city. Much of SR 599 was previously designated as U.S. Route 95 (US 95) prior to completion of the Las Vegas Expressway. The route is also designated as U.S. Route 95 Business (US 95 Bus.).

Route description

SR 599 begins at the intersection of Rancho Drive and Redondo Avenue in the city of Las Vegas. From there, the route heads north along Rancho Drive to intersect the US 95 freeway (at exit 77). The highway continues heading northwest for several miles, briefly skirting the western edge of North Las Vegas and providing access to the North Las Vegas Airport. The route reaches its northern terminus at the end of Rancho Drive, at the interchange with US 95 north and Ann Road (at exits 90 and 91).

US 95 freeway signs for Rancho Drive designate the route as U.S. Route 95 Business, a distinction noted on many maps (including those published by the Nevada Department of Transportation (NDOT)). However, no business route signs are posted along the highway itself and relatively few SR 599 shields can be found on the route.

History
Rancho Drive originally carried State Route 5 from Bonanza Road (present–day State Route 579) northwest out of Las Vegas towards Tonopah—this destination contributed to the road's alternate name of Tonopah Highway. When US 95 was extended into Nevada in 1940, it was routed concurrently with SR 5 on Rancho Drive. The U.S. route remained on Rancho Drive until it was relocated onto the completed Las Vegas Expressway in the early 1980s. SR 599 was designated along the former US 95/SR 5 at this time, in accordance with the 1976 renumbering of Nevada's State Routes.

SR 599 lost mileage between 1996 and 2000. In 2006, the route was pending removal from the state highway system to be transferred to the City of Las Vegas for maintenance, but this has not happened as of January 2008. By October 2011, the southern terminus of SR 599 had been moved from Sahara Avenue to Redondo Avenue, shortening the overall mileage to the current length.

Major intersections

Public transport
RTC Transit Routes 106A, 106B and 119 function on this road.

References

599
Streets in Las Vegas
Streets in North Las Vegas, Nevada
Transportation in Clark County, Nevada
Transportation in the Las Vegas Valley
U.S. Route 95